The Pipeline ambush took place during the Malayan Emergency. An Australian patrol of five troops were ambushed by communist forces. A firefight ensued where other Australian troops came to assist. Three Australians were killed making it the most costly Australian involvement of the Emergency.

References

External links
https://www.awm.gov.au/unit/U60566/
https://www.awm.gov.au/collection/P05001.004

Malayan Emergency
June 1956 events in Asia
1956 in Malaya
Military operations involving Australia